Martin Svrček (born 17 February 2003) is a Slovak cyclist, who currently rides for UCI WorldTeam .

Career
Svrček finished fourth in the 2021 UCI Road World Championships – Junior men's road race missing out on a medal by being beaten in the sprint by Madis Mihkels. Earlier in the year at the UEC European Junior Road Championships Martin finished sixteenth in the time trial 92 seconds down on winner Alec Segaert.

Major results
2020
 National Junior Road Championships
1st  Time trial
3rd Road race
2021
 National Junior Road Championships
1st  Road race
1st  Time trial
 4th Road race, UCI Junior Road World Championships
 6th Paris–Roubaix Juniors
 7th Overall Medzinárodné dni cyklistiky
1st Stage 3
 8th Road race, UEC European Junior Road Championships
2022
 5th Road race, National Road Championships

References

External links
 

2003 births
Living people
Slovak male cyclists